The Swedish Association of Health Professionals (Vårdförbundet) is a trade union with a membership of 114,000 representing nurses, midwives, biomedical scientists and radiographers.

References

International Council of Nurses
Swedish Confederation of Professional Employees
Healthcare trade unions
Trade unions in Sweden
Medical and health organizations based in Sweden
Public Services International
Trade unions established in 1965
Nursing in Sweden